The Serpent is a British crime drama serial developed by Mammoth Screen and commissioned by the BBC. The eight-part limited series is a co-production between BBC One and Netflix. It is based on the crimes of serial killer Charles "the Serpent" Sobhraj, who murdered young tourists from 1975 to 1976. The series stars Tahar Rahim in the lead role as Sobhraj.

The series was shot on location in Thailand, until the COVID-19 pandemic which halted production for five months from March 2020. Filming was completed in Hertfordshire, England, during August 2020. It premiered on BBC One on New Year's Day in 2021 and all eight episodes were immediately made available on BBC iPlayer. The show began streaming on Netflix in April 2021.

Plot 
Set in the mid-1970s, the story follows Charles Sobhraj, a French serial killer of Indian and Vietnamese descent, as he drugs and robs travellers, particularly young backpackers, travelling through Bangkok, Thailand, along the overland. He steals his victims' passports and identities to travel the world and sells stolen gems with girlfriend Marie-Andrée Leclerc. Charles Sobhraj is at the height of his crimes when a Dutch diplomat, Herman Knippenberg, begins investigating the murders of Dutch tourists and uncovers clues leading to Sobhraj.

Cast

Tahar Rahim as Charles Sobhraj
Jenna Coleman as Marie-Andrée Leclerc
Billy Howle as Herman Knippenberg
Ellie Bamber as Angela Knippenberg (later Angela Kane)
Amesh Edireweera as Ajay Chowdhury
Tim McInnerny as Paul Siemons
Chicha Amatayakul as Suda Romyen
Sahajak Boonthanakit as Major General Janthisan
İlker Kaleli as Vitali Hakim
Adam Rothenberg as Gilbert Redland
Mathilde Warnier as Nadine Gires
Supadej "Kenneth" Wongwatanaphan as Yotin
Ellie de Lange as Helena Dekker
James Gerard as Jules Dupont
Apasiri Kulthanan as Lawana
William Brand as Ambassador van Dongen
Chotika Sintuboonkul as Kannika
Ryan O'Donnell as Greg Raynott
Libby Jennings as Viola Raynott
Raphael Roger Levy as Count Michel-Andre Jurion
Fabien Frankel as Dominique Renelleau
Stacy Martin as Juliette Voclain
Alice Englert as Teresa Knowlton
Tim McMullan as Douglas Cartwright
Nicole Beutler as Dagmar Boeder
Johan Van Assche as Otto Boeder
Surasak "Noo" Chaiyaat as Romyen
Grégoire Isvarine as Remi Gires
Ruby Ashbourne Serkis as Celia Austin
Armand Rosbak as Willem Bloem
Deepika Parajuli as Live Goddess "Kumari", Nepal
Dasha Nekrasova as Connie-Jo Bronzich
Thomas Ryckewaert as Jean Huygens
Alyy Khan as Naranda Nath Tully
Teerapat Sajakul as Interpol Lieutenant Colonel Sompol Suthimai
 Pravesh Rana as Thapa, the Nepali police officer
Darshan Jariwala as hotel manager

Episodes

Production

Development and casting
In July 2019, the BBC announced that it had commissioned the eight-part drama from Mammoth Screen, Tom Shankland, and Richard Warlow. Tahar Rahim would star as Charles Sobhraj.

Jenna Coleman, Billy Howle, and Ellie Bamber joined the main cast in September 2019. Warlow and Toby Finlay would write, Shankland and Hans Herbots would direct, and Warlow and Shankland would executive produce alongside Stephen Smallwood, Preethi Mavahalli, Damien Timmer, and Lucy Richer.

Filming
The Serpent was filmed in Thailand across nine provinces, although principal photography took place in the capital Bangkok and in the resort town of Hua Hin in Thailand's Prachuap Khiri Khan province. Shooting lasted about 10 months, with the production team working with local production house Living Films. Filming stopped in late March 2020 due to the COVID-19 pandemic, but resumed in Hertfordshire, England in August 2020 after five-months. Scenes shot upon the resumption of filming were seamlessly blended among existing shots from Thailand, with just minor changes to the script required. According to Jenna Coleman, in multiple TV and radio interviews, scenes taking place in India and France (among other locations) were shot in England due to the production being prevented from filming on location. Later, the BBC Writers Room made the shooting scripts for the episodes available through its online script library; the scripts indicate which scenes needed to be shot in England.

Release
BBC One revealed first look stills of the series in January 2020. A trailer was then released on 17 December 2020. The drama debuted on BBC One on 1 January 2021, followed by Episode 2 a few days later, after which the series settled into a weekly broadcast on Sunday nights. The complete 8-episode series was also released on iPlayer also on 1 January. Both the BBC broadcast and streaming release were available to UK residents only. In early February, the UK version of Amazon began listing a DVD release of the series, available as of 22 February 2021.

Netflix streamed the series internationally in April 2021.

Reception
On Rotten Tomatoes, the series holds an approval rating of 70% based on 33 critic reviews, with an average rating of 6.4/10. The website's critical consensus reads, "Tahar Rahim's unnerving performance brings reptilian menace to The Serpent, but this uneven slice of true crime is too byzantine in structure and too pat about its central villain's motivations to really get under the skin."

The Serpent received generally positive reviews in the UK. Rebecca Nicholson, writing in The Guardian, gave the first episode 3/5 stars, finding the time-hopping plotting unnecessary and confusing, and wondering whether the programme had much to say, while admiring the atmosphere and the 'routinely outstanding cast'. For Euan Ferguson writing in The Observer, who admired Rahim and Coleman's acting, The Serpent was a 'skilful retelling' of the Sobhraj story and one that both pays homage to his victims, while revealing the cultural shortcomings of the flower children. That Rahim underplays Sobhraj's charm was a good thing for Ferguson. However, Rahim's absence of charisma makes it hard to understand how Sobhraj gained a hold over people for Flora Carr, writing in The Radio Times, who gives the show 3/5 stars.

Giving the programme 3/5 stars, Ed Cumming in The Independent found the pace slow and Rahim's acting staying mostly on the right side of the fine line between inscrutable and dull. James Delingpole in The Spectator called it "the best BBC drama series in ages", admiring the period detail, superb casting and absence of "unnecessary politics" as well as noting that it might be especially painful for people who could have found themselves in similar scenarios to those that Charles Sobhraj exploited. By mid-point The Serpent gathers "considerable momentum" according to Trevor Johnson in Sight and Sound reviewing the first four episodes, who goes on to write that the series features an "alluring anti-hero" and excellent score, but is let down by the shallow characterisation of its Thai characters. Rahul Desai of Film Companion called The Serpent “a refreshing restoration of balance" adding that it "reduces Charles Sobhraj from an image to an individual, a portrait to a person – and most importantly, from a human to a reptile."

Angela Kane (formerly Knippenberg) has said that she was unhappy that The Serpent had downplayed her role in cracking the case. The journalist Andrew Anthony, who interviewed Sobhraj twice, said that while the series captured his "enigmatic detachment and quiet menace", it misses his more troubling qualities of wit, charm and "a kind of playful sense of self-mythologising".

In the Netherlands, one publication noted the inability of Billy Howle, playing a Dutchman, to pronounce his Dutch lines accurately.

In Québec and France, it was noted that Jenna Coleman struggled to speak French Canadian accurately.

References

External links
 

The Serpent trailer from the BBC's YouTube channel

2020s British crime drama television series
2021 British television series debuts
2021 British television series endings
2020s British television miniseries
BBC television dramas
Television series set in the 1970s
Television series by Mammoth Screen
Television series by ITV Studios
English-language television shows
Television shows set in Bangkok
Television shows set in India
Television shows set in Delhi
Television shows set in Mumbai
Television shows set in Uttar Pradesh
Television shows set in Paris
Television shows set in Nepal
Television shows filmed in Nepal
True crime television series